Chloe Moriondo (stylized in all lowercase as chloe moriondo) (born September 29, 2002) is an American singer-songwriter and YouTuber. Her style blends elements of indie pop and bedroom pop, with the occasional hyperpop. Her YouTube channel, which she began in January 2014, sits at over 3 million subscribers and over 200 million video views.

Early life, family and education 
Moriondo was born and raised in Detroit, Michigan.

Career
Moriondo self-released her first album, Rabbit Hearted, on July 31, 2018, and her first EP, Spirit Orb, on April 24, 2020. In August 2020, Moriondo was signed to Fueled by Ramen and released "I Want to Be with You".

On May 7, 2021, Moriondo released her first studio album, Blood Bunny with singles "I Want to Be with You" and "Girl on TV". In 2021, she made her late-night debut performing "Bodybag" from her album Blood Bunny on Jimmy Kimmel Live! She later performed a variation of "I Want to Be with You" on The Late Late Show with James Corden.

She released her second EP, puppy luv, in April 2022. She released a deluxe edition of Blood Bunny in June 2022. She joined mxmtoon on her North America tour rising (the tour) from May to June 2022. In October 2022, Moriondo released her album SUCKERPUNCH. From October 12, 2022, through November 19, 2022, she played shows in the United States and Canada. She toured the United Kingdom and mainland Europe from January 28, 2023 through February 18, 2023.

Personal life
Moriondo self-identifies as "nonbinary-ish" but also "just a girl" as of June 2021. She uses she/they pronouns and doesn't label her sexuality. In September 2021, she revealed to her Twitter followers that she no longer identifies as a lesbian.

Discography

Albums

Extended plays

Singles

As lead artist

As featured artist

Notes

References 

2002 births
Bedroom pop musicians
American indie rock musicians
American indie pop musicians
American LGBT singers
American LGBT songwriters
Living people
YouTube channels launched in 2013
Non-binary singers
Non-binary songwriters
21st-century LGBT people
LGBT people from Michigan
Fueled by Ramen artists
American non-binary writers
Music YouTubers